The 2006 Great Yarmouth Borough Council election took place on 4 May 2006 to elect members of Great Yarmouth Borough Council in Norfolk, England. One third of the council was up for election and the Conservative Party stayed in overall control of the council.

After the election, the composition of the council was:
Conservative 22
Labour 16
Others 1

Election result
Overall turnout at the election was 30.74%.

Ward results

References

2006 English local elections
2006
2000s in Norfolk